Institution for Savings in Newburyport and Its Vicinity is a bank based in Newburyport, Massachusetts. It has 15 branches, all of which are in Essex County, Massachusetts. It is a mutual organization.

History
The bank was founded in 1820.

In August 2014, the company acquired Rockport National Bank, which had 4 branches, for $28.3 million in cash.

As of December 31, 2019, it had $3.7 billion in deposits.

References

Banks based in Massachusetts
American companies established in 1820
1820 establishments in Massachusetts
Companies based in Newburyport, Massachusetts